The 1898 Invercargill mayoral election was held on 1 December 1898 as part of that year's local elections.

Incumbent mayor Hugh Mair was defeated by councillor John Stead.

Results
The following table gives the election results:

References

1898 elections in New Zealand
Mayoral elections in Invercargill